United Nations Security Council resolution 1105, adopted unanimously on 9 April 1997, after recalling Resolution 1082 (1996), the Council decided to suspend reduction of the military component of the United Nations Preventive Deployment Force (UNPREDEP) in Macedonia until the end of its current mandate, until 31 May 1997.

The security council reaffirmed its commitment to the sovereignty and territorial integrity of Macedonia. It welcomed the redeployment of UNPREDEP given the ongoing rebellion in Albania, urging the Secretary-General Kofi Annan to consider further redeployments if necessary. He was requested to report to the council by 15 May 1997 with recommendations on a subsequent international presence in Macedonia as mentioned in Resolution 1082.

See also
 Breakup of Yugoslavia
 List of United Nations Security Council Resolutions 1101 to 1200 (1997–1998)
 Macedonia naming dispute
 Yugoslav Wars

References

External links
 
Text of the Resolution at undocs.org

 1105
 1105
1997 in Yugoslavia
1997 in the Republic of Macedonia
 1105
April 1997 events